William de Haseley (died in or before 1283) was an English monastic writer. He was sub-prior of the Benedictine community at Westminster Abbey and master of the novices. He entered the monastery in about 1266 and compiled the Consuetudinarium Monachorum Westmonasteriensium for his abbot, Richard de la Ware.

Life 
William de Haseley, a monk of Westminster, "magister novitorum", and finally sub-prior there, compiled, at the request of Richard de la Ware, abbot of Westminster, in 1266 the Consuetudinarium Monachorum Westmonasteriensium, part of which is extant among the Cotton MSS. He also acquired some books for the monastic library. He was buried in the church around 1283, for on 3 May 1283 Hugh Balsham (or Belesale), then bishop of Ely, granted an indulgence of twenty days to all persons visiting Westminster Abbey and praying at Haseley's tomb. A copy of the indulgence is among the muniments of Westminster Abbey.

References

Sources 

 
 "William de Haseley". Westminster Abbey. Retrieved 16 October 2022.

Attribution:

Further reading 

 Flete, John (1909). The History of Westminster Abbey. Robinson, Joseph Armitage (ed.). Cambridge: Cambridge University Press. p. 114.
 Ker, Neil Ripley (1964). Medieval Libraries of Great Britain: A List of Surviving Books. Royal Historical Society Guides and Handbooks, No. 3. 2nd ed. London: Royal Historical Society. p. 314.
 Pearce, Ernest Harold (1916). The Monks of Westminster. Cambridge: Cambridge University Press. p. 56.
 Thompson, Edward Maunde, ed. (1904). Customary of the Benedictine Monasteries of Saint Augustine, Canterbury, and Saint Peter, Westminster, Vol. 2. Henry Bradshaw Society (H.B.S.), Vol. 28. London: Harrison and Sons. p. vii.

13th-century deaths
13th-century English Roman Catholic priests
13th-century English writers